Events from the year 1343 in Ireland.

Incumbent
Lord: Edward III

Events

 May 19 – Robert Savage is appointed Seneschal of Ulster.
 October 26 – Ferghal mac Diarmata becomes Lord of Moylurg after his brother, Conchobhar Mac Diarmada, dies.
 Muircheartach Ó Briain, King of Thomond, dies. He is succeeded by his brother, Diarmaid, who is expelled by Brian Bán MacDomnaill Ó Briain. 
 Toirdhealbhach Ó Conchobhair recovers kingship of Connacht from Aodh mac Aodh Breifneach. He makes peace with Mac Diarmada. 
 King Niall Ó Domhnaill of Tir Conaill is deposed by his nephew Aonghus, with the aid and support of O Baoighill, Ó Dochartaigh, the MacSweenys and Aodh Reamhar Ó Neill.
 Clann Mhuircheartaigh is expelled from Bréifne by Ualgarg Mór Ó Ruairc, O Conchobhair, and Tadgh Mág Ragnaill. He is given refuge by King Aonghus of Tír Conaill in Tír Aodha (Tirhugh, County Donegal).
 Clanricarde and de Berminghams invade Uí Maine.
 Maurice Earl of Desmond occupies Imokilly (east County Cork).
 John L'Archers, Prior of the Order of St. John of Jerusalem appointed Lord Chancellor of Ireland

Births

Deaths
 October 26 – Conchobhar Mac Diarmada, Lord of Moylurg;
 Muircheartach Ó Briain, King of Thomond

References

"The Annals of Ireland by Friar John Clyn", edited and translated with an Introduction, by Bernadette Williams, Four Courts Press, 2007. , pp. 240–244.
"A New History of Ireland VIII: A Chronology of Irish History to 1976", edited by T. W. Moody, F.X. Martin and F.J. Byrne. Oxford, 1982. .
http://www.ucc.ie/celt/published/T100001B/index.html
http://www.ucc.ie/celt/published/T100005C/index.html
http://www.ucc.ie/celt/published/T100010B/index.html

 
1340s in Ireland
Ireland
Years of the 14th century in Ireland